Houstonia correllii, the Zapata County bluet, or Correll's bluet, is a species of plants in the Rubiaceae. It is known only from Zapata County in southern Texas. It is a prostrate, mat-forming plant with white flowers.

References

External links
Photo of herbarium specimen at Missouri Botanical Garden, Donovan S. Correll - 32250 , collected in Texas, Houstonia correllii

correllii
Endemic flora of Texas
Zapata County, Texas
Plants described in 1975
Flora without expected TNC conservation status